The 2022 Abierto Tampico was a professional tennis tournament played on outdoor hard courts. It was the sixth edition of the tournament and first as a WTA 125 tournament. It took place at the Centro Libanés Mexicano de Tampico in Tampico, Mexico, between 24 and 29 October 2022.

Champions

Singles

  Elisabetta Cocciaretto def.  Magda Linette 7–6(7–5), 4–6, 6–1

Doubles

  Tereza Mihalíková /  Aldila Sutjiadi def.  Ashlyn Krueger /  Elizabeth Mandlik 7–5, 6–2

Singles entrants

Seeds 

 1 Rankings as of 17 October 2022.

Other entrants 
The following players received a wildcard into the singles main draw:
  Eugenie Bouchard
  Marie Bouzková
  Leylah Fernandez
  Elise Mertens
  Kateřina Siniaková

The following player received entry into the main draw through protected ranking:
  Varvara Flink

The following players received entry from the qualifying draw:
  Bianca Fernandez
  Elvina Kalieva
  Aldila Sutjiadi
  Sachia Vickery

Withdrawals 
Before the tournament
  Bianca Andreescu → replaced by  Carol Zhao
  Linda Fruhvirtová → replaced by  Ashlyn Krueger
  Anna Kalinskaya → replaced by  You Xiaodi
  Marta Kostyuk → replaced by  Anna-Lena Friedsam
  Ann Li → replaced by  Alycia Parks
  Nuria Párrizas Díaz → replaced by  Eva Vedder
  Lesia Tsurenko → replaced by  Elina Avanesyan
  Donna Vekić → replaced by  Nao Hibino

Doubles entrants

Seeds 

 1 Rankings as of 17 October 2022.

Other entrants 
The following pair received a wildcard into the doubles main draw:
  Ana Paola González Domínguez /  Quetzali Vázquez Montesinos

Withdrawals 
Before the tournament
  Fernanda Contreras Gómez /  Alycia Parks → replaced by  Elvina Kalieva /  Renata Zarazúa
  Alexa Guarachi /  Asia Muhammad → replaced by  Bianca Fernandez /  Leylah Fernandez

References

External links 
 Official website

2022 WTA 125 tournaments
Tennis tournaments in Mexico
2022 in Mexican tennis
October 2022 sports events in Mexico
Abierto Tampico